Jenni Hiirikoski (born 30 March 1987) is a Finnish ice hockey player and captain of Luleå HF/MSSK in the Swedish Women's Hockey League (SDHL) and the Finnish national team.

She is widely considered one of the best active ice hockey defencemen in the world, having won the IIHF Directorate Best Defenceman award seven times during the 2010s. She is currently the second all-time leading scorer among SDHL defenders and the third all-time leading scorer for Luleå, winning three SDHL championships with the club, has been named SDHL Defender of the Year twice, and is one of only two players to have been named top Olympic defender twice.

Playing career 
Hiirikoski grew up in Lempäälä, Finland, and played youth ice hockey with the local club Lempäälän Kisa (LeKi).

She began her premier league career in 2001, at age 14, with the Tampereen Ilves Naiset of the Naisten SM-sarja (renamed Naisten Liiga in 2017). With Ilves, she won the Finnish Championship in 2006 and the Finnish Championship silver (runner-up) medals in 2004 and 2005.

After achieving Finnish Championship gold with Ilves, Hiirikoski joined the 2006–07 Espoo Blues, which had a roster overflowing with talent; in addition to Hiirikoski, the team included Karoliina Rantamäki, Noora Räty, Emma Terho, Marjo Voutilainen and other all-stars of the Finnish national team. With so much accumulated skill, it was no surprise that Espoo Blues claimed the Finnish Champions in 2007.

Hiirikoski returned to Ilves for the 2007–08 season and won her third Finnish Championship silver medal with them in 2008.

For the 2008–09 season, Hiirikoski joined her first club outside of Finland, signing with SKIF Nizhny Novgorod in the Russian Women's Hockey League (replaced by the Zhenskaya Hockey League (ZhHL) in 2015). The roster included two other Finns, her teammates from the Espoo Blues Karoliina Rantamäki and Marjo Voutilainen. SKIF was dominant and won both the Russian Championship and the 2009 IIHF European Women's Champions Cup.

In June 2016, she announced that she was moving to Sweden to sign with SDHL club Luleå HF/MSSK as they would attempt to defend their SDHL championship. She scored 45 points in 36 games in her debut SDHL season, the league's leading scorer among defenders and fourth overall, serving as an assistant captain for the team. She added another 4 points in 4 playoff games as Luleå was eliminated in the semi-finals by HV71.

She was named Luleå captain ahead of the 2017–18 season.

After going without a point in her first twelve games of the 2019–20 season, despite leading the league in shots, she finished the season with 40 points in 34 games. Luleå would make it to the playoff finals before the season was canceled due to the COVID-19 pandemic in Sweden.

She was nominated for Luleå resident of the year in 2019. She was named the eighth best women's hockey player of the decade by The Hockey News in December 2019, with the magazine stating that it was possible to "make a case that she’s been the most criminally underrated player of the decade and maybe in women’s hockey history." Both she and Ronja Savolainen were nominated for the 2019–20 SDHL Best Defender Award, though the award ultimately went to Sidney Morin of HV71.

Style of play 
Hiirikoski's speed, on-ice awareness, and passing ability have drawing comparisons to Erik Karlsson at the height of his career.

International career 
Hiirikoski made her debut with the Finnish national team at age 17 in the 2004 IIHF Women's World Championship (her birthday coincided with the first day of the tournament) and has appeared in every major international tournament since. She has served as team captain continuously since the 2011–12 season.

Representing Finland, she has won three Olympic bronze medals: at the 2010 Winter Olympics in Vancouver, the 2018 Winter Olympics in PyeongChang, and the 2022 Winter Olympics in Beijing. She also competed with the Finnish national team in the women's ice hockey tournament at the 2014 Winter Olympics in Sochi, at which Finland placed fifth.

, Hiirikoski has participated in thirteen IIHF Women's World Championships, winning a silver medal at the tournament in 2019 and seven bronze medals, at the tournaments in 2004, 2008, 2009, 2011, 2015, 2017, and 2021.

She was involved in the controversial no-goal call in overtime of the 2019 IIHF Women's World Championship gold-medal game, which cost Finland the victory after the goal scored by Finland’s Petra Nieminen was waved off because Hiirikoski had made contact with American goaltender Alex Cavallini outside of the crease.

Career statistics

Regular season and playoffs

International

Sources:

Honors and achievements

References

External links

1987 births
Living people
Finnish women's ice hockey defencemen
Ice hockey players at the 2010 Winter Olympics
Ice hockey players at the 2014 Winter Olympics
Ice hockey players at the 2018 Winter Olympics
Ice hockey players at the 2022 Winter Olympics
Medalists at the 2010 Winter Olympics
Medalists at the 2018 Winter Olympics
Medalists at the 2022 Winter Olympics
Olympic bronze medalists for Finland
Olympic ice hockey players of Finland
Olympic medalists in ice hockey
People from Lempäälä
Finnish expatriate ice hockey players in Sweden
Finnish expatriate ice hockey players in Russia
Luleå HF/MSSK players
Ilves Naiset players
Espoo Blues Naiset players
JYP Jyväskylä Naiset players
Sportspeople from Pirkanmaa